Ahmed Trabelsi (born 27 July 1973) is a Tunisian footballer. He played in seven matches for the Tunisia national football team in 1995 and 1996. He was also named in Tunisia's squad for the 1996 African Cup of Nations tournament.

References

1973 births
Living people
Tunisian footballers
Tunisia international footballers
1996 African Cup of Nations players
Place of birth missing (living people)
Association footballers not categorized by position